Point blank is a close range for a ballistics shot.

Point Blank may also refer to:

Music
Point Blank (band), a Texas-based rock band from the 1980s best known for their hit "Nicole"
Point Blank (1976 album), a self-titled album from this group
Point Blank (hip hop group), a Canadian hip-hop collective
Point Blank (2008 album), a self-titled album from this group
Point Blank (Bonfire album)
Point Blank (Dub Pistols album)
Point Blank (Electric Pandas album), 1985
Point Blank (Sean Kingston album)
Point Blank (Nailbomb album), 1994
Point Blank Records, a record company
Point Blank Music College, a school in London
"Point Blank" (Bruce Springsteen song), a song from his 1980 album The River

Films
Point Blank (1967 film), a 1967 John Boorman film starring Lee Marvin
Point Blank (1998 film), a film starring Mickey Rourke and featuring James Gammon
Point Blank (2010 film), a 2010 French film
Point Blank (2019 film)

Television
Point Blank (TV series), a Canadian television comedy series

Video games
Point Blank (video game series), a series of light gun shooter arcade games by Namco
Point Blank (2008 video game), a 2008 computer game developed by Zepetto

Novels and publishing
Point Blank (publisher), a mystery books imprint of Wildside Press
PointBlank (novel), a 2006 novel by David Sherman and Dan Cragg
Point Blanc or Point Blank, an Alex Rider-series novel by Anthony Horowitz

Other entertainment
Point Blank (comics), a comic book by Ed Brubaker and Colin Wilson
Pointblank (Transformers), a character in the Transformers franchise

Places
Point Blank, Texas, a town in the United States

History
Operation Pointblank, World War II Allied bombing offensive
Pointblank directive, an Allied war strategic policy of World War II

See also
Grosse Pointe Blank, a 1997 American comedy movie